Novokizganovo (Yañı Kiźgän) is a rural locality (a village) in Tazlarovsky Selsoviet, Burayevsky District, Bashkortostan, Russia. The population was 491 as of 2010. There are 12 streets.

Geography 
Novokizganovo is located 23 km northeast of Burayevo (the district's administrative centre) by road. Starokizganovo is the nearest rural locality.

References 

Rural localities in Burayevsky District